This is a list of submissions to the 60th Academy Awards for Best Foreign Language Film. The Academy Award for Best Foreign Language Film was created in 1956 by the Academy of Motion Picture Arts and Sciences to honour non-English-speaking films produced outside the United States. The award is handed out annually, and is accepted by the winning film's director, although it is considered an award for the submitting country as a whole. Countries are invited by the Academy to submit their best films for competition according to strict rules, with only one film being accepted from each country.

For the 60th Academy Awards, thirty films were submitted in the category Academy Award for Best Foreign Language Film. The critically acclaimed Wings of Desire, by Wim Wenders, submitted by West Germany, wasn't nominated, despite being one of the favourites. Indonesia submitted a film for the first time, and Cuba submitted a film for the first time in a decade. The Soviet Union submitted a film in Georgian (which was produced in 1984, but banned until 1987), India chose a film in Tamil, and Norway selected the first-ever film made in Northern Sami. The bolded titles were the five nominated films, which came from France, Italy, Norway, Spain, and the eventual winner, Babette's Feast, from Denmark.

Submissions

References

60